1 Aquarii is a binary star system in the zodiac constellation of Aquarius, about 257 light years away from the Sun. 1 Aquarii is the Flamsteed designation. It is visible to the naked eye as a faint, orange-hued star with an apparent visual magnitude of 5.151, located a degree north of the celestial equator. The system is moving closer to the Earth with a heliocentric radial velocity of −41 km/s.

Systematic observation for determining the orbit of this system began in 2002, some eighty years following the first radial velocity measurements. The visible component is an aging giant star with a stellar classification of K1III. At the age of 1.26 billion years old it is a red clump giant, which indicates it is on the horizontal branch and is generating energy through helium fusion at its core. The star has 1.5 times the mass of the Sun and has expanded to 11 times the Sun's radius. It is radiating 53.7 times the Sun's luminosity from its enlarged photosphere at an effective temperature of 4,715 K.

The mass of the companion appears small, suggesting a red dwarf no higher than class M5. In addition to the spectroscopic companion there are two faint optical companions that have no physical relation to 1 Aqr.

Etymology
1 Aquarii was known to the ancients as al-sa'd al-malik, or "the lucky star of the king."  Interpreting the unexpressed Arabic vowels, al-sa'd al-mulk, gives an alternate translation of  "the lucky star of the kingdom."  In English, the name is Sadalmelik (or Sadalmelek), although rarely used today.

References

K-type giants
Horizontal-branch stars
Spectroscopic binaries
Triple stars
Aquarius (constellation)
BD+00 4064
Aquarii, 001
196758
101936
7897